Nicholas Gunn is a classically trained songwriter, lyricist, and music producer. He is known for his originating instrumental works and his current works featuring vocalists from the electronic music space across Trance, Melodic House, and Chill. He is also the owner of Blue Dot Studios, a record label and music publishing company, based in Los Angeles, California.

Early life and education
Nicholas Graham Gunn was born in Rochester, Kent in South East England. He studied flute under a formal classical education from age seven till age eleven when his family moved to Southern California.  After moving to Southern California Gunn continued his classical flute studies under private instruction.  During junior high school and high school Gunn played wind ensemble in the band during concert season and drums and percussion during the marching season.  After high school Gunn sidestepped music for a year, focusing his efforts towards modeling and acting which led to a small role on the national TV show Freddy's Nightmares as Monkey Puke Stone on season 2 episode 11 "Dreams That Kill".

Instrumental music career 
Early on Gunn found himself immersed in a passion for recording his own instrumental style of music. Gunn shunned popular terms such as New Age and the connotation associated with his own music, preferring the term Instrumental or World Music.  After unsuccessful attempts to obtain a recording deal from submissions, Gunn self-released his debut recording Afternoon in Sedona in 1992.  With national radio starting to escalate and CD sales starting to occur, Gunn received interest from nature retail chain Natural Wonders, which led him to a record deal with Sausalito, California-based instrumental music label Real Music.

Re-released under Real Music in 1993, Afternoon in Sedona became an instant best seller at national retail chains such as The Nature Company and Natural Wonders. It was his second album, The Sacred Fire, released in 1994, that first landed Gunn on the Billboard charts for New Age Album, where it ran for five weeks and peaked at number ten.

Taking part in Real Music's "National Park Series", Gunn's third album, The Music of the Grand Canyon, was released in 1995 and sold over 100,000 copies its first year. Once again Gunn found himself Top Ten on the Billboard charts and charted for fourteen weeks. Outside of Real Music and the "National Park Series", Gunn has gone on to release numerous albums influenced by the beauty of America's landscape and parks, such as Return to Grand Canyon (1999), Through the Great Smoky Mountains (2002), Journey to Yellowstone (2003), and Beyond Grand Canyon (2006).  Beyond Grand Canyon was also released as a DVD, in which Gunn paired his musical compositions with photography of the Grand Canyon taken by Michael Fatali, creating a unique audio-visual experience.

On Crossroads, his fourth album released in 1996, Gunn began to incorporate a Latin influence into his sound, a theme which has subsequently embraced a number of his other albums, most notably Breathe (2004) and Encanto (2007), on which he collaborated with award-winning Latin guitarist Johannes Linstead.  It was also on his 14th album, Thirty-One Nights, that he heavily incorporated this Latin influence working with Flamenco guitarist, Chris Fossek. Inspired by his trip to Mexico's Yucatan Peninsula, the album also features Spanish spoken word.  Released on 11 September 2012, Thirty-One Nights charted No. 8 on the Billboard chart in its debut week. It was also chosen by John Diliberto and Echoes as one of the Top 25 Albums for October 2012.

Since 1991, Gunn has sold millions of copies of his instrumental music albums, an impressive feat considering that the marketing of his albums have mostly bypassed the traditional route of radio and mainstream outlets, finding large success through niche retail chains such as the Nature Company, Natural Wonders, and gift stores throughout the National Parks.

Gunn began combining his electronic sound with his instrumental roots in 2015 with the release of Under the Influence of Music. In his subsequent singles, Ibiza Sunset and Saint Lucia, one can hear his classic instrumental "Nicholas Gunn" sound moving into a more Ambient / Electronic space.

In 2018, Gunn continued this transition towards a more electronic sound and began introducing his own style of vocals and lyric writing. Older (feat. Alina Renae), released in 2018, showcases his first vocal-driven track under his Nicholas Gunn solo career. This was followed by the album, Riding the Thermals, which features four vocal tracks by the vocalist Alina Renae. Riding the Thermals went on to peak at #6 on the USA iTunes Electronic Albums and #22 on Brazil's iTunes Best Selling Albums, amongst others. On April 24, 2020, Gunn continued to shape his vocal ambient/electronic sound with the release of his 20th studio recording, Pacific Blue, which again features four vocal tracks by singer Alina Renae, and on February 12, 2021, he released Sound Condition, a compilation of 10 new songs, also featuring Renae's vocals.

In 2022, Gunn transcended genre by diversifying his release schedule with both ambient instrumentals on his own label, Blue Dot, all the while releasing vocal driven chill house works on Armada Music.

Electronic music career 
Gunn quickly immersed himself into electronic music by founding the musical act Limelght with then collaborator and partner, Tanner Wilfong. The duo released music under the moniker Limelght from 2017 through 2019 until the act was retired. In 2020 Gunn then began transitioning his ambient sound towards a more electronic House and Chill sound, featuring vocalists from around the globe. Gaining attention from electronic music label giant, Armada Music, Gunn expanded his reach and musical style by releasing music on this trend setting label. His track Higher with musical act York featuring world renowned vocalist Sam Martin as well as California featuring Chris Howard and Sensing You with AVIRA, all surpassed six million streams in 2022. Making a huge leap with his release schedule in 2022 Gunn released multiple new singles collaborating with artists such as Dave Neven, Derek Luttrell, RAEYA, Diana Miro, Protoculture, Jarod Glawe and Richard Durand with his collaboration, Love You More with Dave Neven, receiving #43 on the coveted A State of Trance top 50. Remixes from industry dance legends such as Richard Durand and Giuseppe Ottaviani have also gone on to become favorites on A State of Trance which is followed by over 40 million listeners per week.

Songwriter and lyricist career 
Gunn has emerged as one of the leading songwriters and lyricists within the electronic music space, writing music behind the scenes for such renowned artists as Armin van Buuren, Aly & Fila, Luke Bond, Andrew Rayel, C-systems, Harshil Kamdar and many more. In 2021 Gunn's song, For All Time (feat Kazi Jay) was voted Tune of the Year by fans on A State of Trance.

Entrepreneur
In January 2019, after a hiatus from owning and operating his own label, Gunn saw an opportunity to remerge as a label owner and entrepreneur and started Blue Dot Studios, a record label focused on individuality and artistry based in Los Angeles, CA. The labels' first release, in 2019, was Gunn's own album Riding the Thermals. This was followed by the release of artist Little Warrior, and her album Lovesick, and then a single titled Time for Peace by artist Anna B May.

In 2020, Gunn released his album Pacific Blue which won several accolades including the Zone Music Reporter Best Chill/Groove Album of the year. In 2021 Gunn released Sound Condition which continued to express his continued desire to work with lyrics and vocalists.

In 2020, Blue Dot Studios expanded upon its relationship with Sony The Orchard and entered into an exclusive publishing administration deal with Sony / ATV. Today, Blue Dot Studios continues to thrive distributing several labels with many releases each month.

Philanthropist
Over the course of his career, Gunn has consistently monetarily contributed to the National Park systems. Along with record label Real Music, Gunn donated a portion of the proceeds from each sale of The Music of the Grand Canyon to the Grand Canyon Association. To date, in excess of $130,000 has been donated from sales. Gunn also named the American Lung Association as a beneficiary of a portion of sales from his album Breathe.

Discography

Albums and singles
 1993 – Afternoon in Sedona
 1994 – The Sacred Fire
 1995 – The Music of the Grand Canyon
 1996 – Crossroads
 1998 – Passion in My Heart
 1999 – Return to Grand Canyon
 2001 – The Great Southwest
 2002 – Through the Great Smoky Mountains: A Musical Journey
 2002 – A Christmas Classic
 2003 – Journey to Yellowstone
 2004 – Breathe
 2006 – Beyond Grand Canyon
 2007 – Encanto (Johannes Linstead and Nicholas Gunn)
 2012 – Thirty-One Nights
 2013 – Twenty Years of Discovery
 2015 – Beauty (single from series Under the Influence of Music)
 2016 – Nature (single from series Under the Influence of Music)
 2016 – Love (single from series Under the Influence of Music)
 2016 – Reflection (single from series Under the Influence of Music)
 2016 – Celtic Wedding Processional
 2016 – Passion (single from series Under the Influence of Music)
 2016 – Material (single from series Under the Influence of Music)
 2016 – Under the Influence of Music: The Complete Series
 2017 – Ibiza Sunset (single)
 2017 – Saint Lucia (single)
 2017 – Don't Leave Me Now (single) Limelght 
 2018 – Older (feat. Alina Renae) (single)
 2018 – Canis Major (single) Limelght 
 2018 – Intoxicated featuring Alina Renae (single) Limelght 
 2018 – Right Now featuring Alina Renae (single) Limelght 
 2018 – We Are Light featuring Alina Renae (single) Limelght 
 2018 – Run and Hide featuring Alina Renae (single) Limelght 
 2018 – Don't Leave Me Now, Tom Fall Remix (single) Limelght 
 2018 – Little Warrior – Where Did You Go, Limelght Remix (single) Limelght 
 2019 – Riding the Thermals (Studio Album)
 2019 – Riding the Thermals (Deluxe Edition)
 2019 – Nicholas Gunn – I'm Coming Home, Limelght Remix (single) Limelght 
 2019 – Those Summer Days featuring Jaik Willis (single) Limelght 
 2019 – Run and Hide, The Remixes (singles) Limelght 
 2020 – Pacific Blue (Studio Album)
 2021 – Sound Condition (Studio Album)
 2021 – Higher with York featuring Sam Martin (single)
 2021 – Broken featuring Alina Renae, Giuseppe Ottaviani Remix (single)
 2021 – Angels featuring Alina Renae, Scorz Remix (single)
 2021 – California featuring Chris Howard (single)
 2021 – Sensing You with AVIRA (single)
 2021 – Beautiful Mind (single)
 2022 – Love You More with Dave Neven (single)
 2022 – Lose Control featuring Derek Luttrell (single)
 2022 – Wild Child featuring RAEYA (single)
 2022 – Entering (Twin Falls) (single)
 2022 – Into the Bliss (single)
 2022 – Hold Me Tight featuring Diana Miro (single)
 2022 – Wings with Protoculture featuring Alina Renae (single)
 2022 – Lighthouse with Jarod Glawe featuring Chris Howard (single)
 2022 – Not Afraid with Richard Durand featuring RAEYA (single)
 2022 – Follow You featuring Alina Renae (single)

Songwriting Credits

See also
 Johannes Linstead
 List of ambient music artists

References

External links
 Official website

1968 births
People from Rochester, Kent
English multi-instrumentalists
Living people
Musicians from Kent